Gujarat, a state of India, has airports which have access to international flights, domestic and some disused airstrips for emergency purposes. The airports are operated and owned by either the Airports Authority of India, Indian Air Force, Government of Gujarat or private companies.

There are three international airports, nine domestic airports, two private airports and three military bases in Gujarat. Two more airports are under construction. There are three disused airports, one of them serving as a flying school. Gujarat State Aviation Infrastructure Company Limited (GUJSAIL) has been established by the Government of Gujarat to foster the development of aviation infrastructure in Gujarat.

The airports provide services to tourists and the state population commuting to different parts of the state.

List 
The list includes international, domestic, military and non-operational airports with their respective ICAO and IATA codes.

Other disused airfields and airports owned by the Government of Gujarat are located at Chad Bet, Dhrangadhra, Wankaner, Wadhwan, Radhanpur, Khambhaliya, Morbi, Parsoli, Limdi. Most of them were developed by the erstwhile princely states during the period of British India. A disused military airstrip owned by the Indian Air Force is located at Khavda in Kutch. 

New airfields are being planned by the GUJSAIL at Morbi and tourism and pilgrimage places such as Palitana, Ambaji, Dwarka and Dholavira. The Government of Gujarat has signed memorandum of understanding in 2016 with the Union Ministry of Civil Aviation for overhaul of 11 airports and runways at Surat, Bhavnagar, Jamnagar, Porbandar, Keshod, Junagadh, Amreli, Bhuj, Kandla, Deesa and Mehsana under the Regional Connectivity Scheme.

The Airports Authority of India has planned an international airport at Dholera and proposed a domestic airport at Rajpipla.

References 

Gujarat
 
Airports
Buildings and structures in Gujarat